Georgi Yordanov (born 21 July 1963) is a Bulgarian former professional footballer who played as a midfielder.

Honours
Levski Sofia
 Bulgarian League: 1987–88
 Bulgarian Cup: 1985–86
 Cup of the Soviet Army: 1986–87, 1987–88

CSKA Sofia
 Bulgarian League: 1996–97
 Bulgarian Cup: 1996–97

External links
 
 Profile at LevskiSofia.info

1963 births
Living people
Bulgarian footballers
Bulgaria international footballers
Association football midfielders
1986 FIFA World Cup players
PFC Lokomotiv Plovdiv players
OFC Sliven 2000 players
PFC Levski Sofia players
Sporting de Gijón players
CA Marbella footballers
FC Septemvri Sofia players
PFC CSKA Sofia players
PFC Spartak Pleven players
FC Chernomorets Burgas players
First Professional Football League (Bulgaria) players
La Liga players
Bulgarian expatriate footballers
Expatriate footballers in Spain
Bulgarian expatriate sportspeople in Spain